The 1984 British National Track Championships were a series of track cycling competitions held from 6–9 September 1984 at the Leicester Velodrome. The Championships were held later than usual because of the 1984 Summer Olympics and the 1984 UCI Track Cycling World Championships which both took place in August.

Medal summary

Men's Events

Women's Events

References

1984 in British sport
September 1984 sports events in the United Kingdom